The Housing Industry Association (HIA) is an association of more than 40,000 members working in the housing industry. It is the peak national industry association for the residential construction and home building, renovation and development industry in Australia.

The organisation's headquarters are located in Canberra while there are large offices in each capital city.

Services
HIA provides a range of services and information to assist all those in the home building industry.  
In particular they develop and advocate policies which recognise the importance of the housing industry to all Australians. HIA advocate the views and policies of their members by contributing to enquiries and forums that impact on the residential building sector. Certain policy areas cover economics, industry, building, planning, industrial relations, legal, environment, training and skills.

The association conducts surveys and publishes reports including new home sales.  It is able to provide recommended builders for specific areas to potential clients.

History
At a meeting on the 21 January 1946 by interested parties it was agreed to establish a housing industry organisation.  It was initially called the Builders and Allied Trades Association (BATA).  In its first three years the group signed up 1,000 members. In June 1965 the organisation became a national association.

See also

Australian property bubble
Silberberg v The Builders Collective of Australia Inc.

References

Trade associations based in Australia
1946 establishments in Australia
Organizations established in 1946
Organisations based in Canberra
Housing in Australia